Student & Starter (S&S or StuSta) is a local political party in the city of Utrecht. Student & Starter was founded in 2013 and is run by students and post-graduates.

History
As of today, S&S is only one of four successful examples of student parties being able to win seats in a municipal council in the Netherlands. The councillors of this local political party rotate their seats after one or two years in the municipal council (instead of the regular four-year term). This is done both for practical reasons, but also to introduce new ideas to the municipal council. The party is closely related to other Dutch student parties such as STIP in Delft and Student en Stad in Groningen.

Ideology
S&S has no specific ideology, since its members come from a broad range of ideologies and national parties. They are united by the need for a local, independent voice for young people in Utrecht. During the municipal election of 2014 the party chose three key features in their programme: more affordable housing, especially for students and youth in general, more employment for the recently graduated and lastly investments in public transport and facilities for bicycles. Their election campaign in 2018 had a similar set of policies and principles.

Elections

See also
 Student activism
 Students' union
 Youth participation
 Youth engagement
 Municipal politics in the Netherlands

References

External links
  (in Dutch)
 Election Programme for the election of 2014 (in English)

Local political parties in the Netherlands
Political parties established in 2013
Utrecht (city)
Student political organisations in the Netherlands
Politics of Utrecht (province)